Saxelby is a surname. Notable people with the surname include:

 Ian Saxelby (born 1989), English cricketer, nephew of Mark and Kevin
 Kevin Saxelby (born 1959), English cricketer 
 Mark Saxelby (1969–2000), English cricketer

See also
 Saxelbye, village in Leicestershire